Convoy is a 1940 British war film, produced by Ealing Studios, directed by Pen Tennyson and starring Clive Brook, John Clements and Edward Chapman. Convoy was Tennyson's last film before he was killed in an aircraft crash, while serving in the Royal Navy.

Plot 
A Royal Navy cruiser, HMS Apollo commanded by Lt. Tom Armitage (Clive Brook) returns to base to find all leave has been cancelled and they are to start out straight away for a special mission. Supplemented with a new first officer, Lieutenant Cranford (John Clements) who turns out to have caused the captain's divorce a few years earlier, they are sent to meet a convoy in the North Sea and escort it safely into British coastal waters.

One stubborn freighter captain from the SS Seaflower, who has a cargo hold full of Polish refugees, mainly Jews, lags the main convoy and is stopped by a U-boat. At first they bluff their way past claiming to be a neutral ship. However they are tailed by the U-boat as they try to join the convoy. They telegram the Navy to send a destroyer to help them, emphasising that they have two British women on board. The navy refuses to either acknowledge or to help, saying it will jeopardise the main convoy.

Seaflower is then captured by a U-boat which sets a trap for the convoy escort. One of the passengers is Lucy Armitage (Judy Campbell), the former wife of the cruiser's captain, as well as the former lover of the first officer. A reconnaissance aircraft sent from the British, finds the freighter and the German fleet, but the pilot and co-pilot are shot and the aircraft falls in the sea.

The Germans make use of this, sending urgent messages from the freighter, claiming it is sinking and naming her as one of the passengers. When the first officer takes the bait and tries to send a destroyer to the freighter's rescue, the captain locks him up, as all ships must protect the convoy. Eventually, a North Sea patrol destroyer comes to the rescue, sinking the U-boat and escorts the freighter to the convoy, where the captain and his ex-wife meet and come to an understanding.

However, the German pocket battleship Deutschland soon appears. Although his cruiser is hopelessly outgunned, the captain decides to attack in order to keep the battleship away from the convoy until British battleships arrive. During the battle, the captain and his wife's former lover reconcile before the latter dies flooding the magazine in order to save the ship. The British battleships arrive at the last minute.

Cast

Clive Brook as Captain Tom Armitage
John Clements as 1st Officer - Lt David Cranford
Edward Chapman as Capt Eckersley
Judy Campbell as Lucy Armitage
Penelope Dudley-Ward as Mabel
Edward Rigby as Mr Matthews
Charles Williams as Shorty Howard
Allan Jeayes as Cmdr. Blount
Michael Wilding as Dot
Harold Warrender as Lt. Cmdr. Martin
David Hutcheson as Capt Sandeman
George Carney as Bates
Al Millen as Knowles
Charles Farrell as Walker
John Laurie as Gates
George Benson as Parker
Hay Petrie as Minesweeper skipper
Mervyn Johns as Minesweeper's mate
Albert Lieven as U-boat commander
John Wengraf as Cmdr. Deutschland
Edward Lexy as Merchantman skipper
John Glyn-Jones as Merchantman's mate
Patrick Holt as Holt
Stewart Granger as Sutton
Anton Diffring as U-boat officer (uncredited)

Production
Writer and director Pen Tennyson served in the Royal Navy Volunteer Reserve (RNVR) at the time of the production of Convoy.

Soundtrack
The music in Convoy is by Ernest Irving and includes a slowed down version of "Rule, Britannia!".

Background
In many scenes, the actors are clearly standing in front of screens and in one scene the pennant number 41 supposedly on the side of HMS Apollo is seen but the image has been reversed. However the only actual ship in service during the Second World War with pennant number 41 was the V-class destroyer .

Deutschland was the lead ship of the heavy cruisers (termed pocket battleships by the British) which also included Admiral Sheer and Graf Spee.  Deutschland was renamed Lutzow in January 1940 after the loss of Graf Spee in the Battle of the River Plate and sunk as a target ship by the Russian navy in 1947.

Reception
Convoy premiered at the New Gallery Cinema in London on 5 July 1940, as part of a double bill with The Saint's Double Trouble.

The reviewer in The Times in his review of Convoy, wrote that "this film up to a point succeeds in giving some idea of the work implied in the title. The pity is that it did not go farther, risk the charge of being labelled documentary". but concluded that the film "has some substantial merits to set against its lack of austerer virtues."

After Convoy had opened at the Rialto in New York City in January 1941, Theodore Strauss. the reviewer in The New York Times wrote, "if the film fails in its frankly propagandistic mission it is because of spurious craftsmanship and because it is a little too self-consciously heroic. ... The actors, including Clive Brook and John Clements, are all so teddibly British in the face of grave danger that their calm becomes unconvincing."

Box Office
Convoy earned at least £50,000 outside England.

According to Kinematograph Weekly it was the most popular British film of 1940 in Britain.

References

Notes

Citations

Bibliography

 Evans, Alun. Brassey's Guide to War Films. Dulles, Virginia: Potomac Books, 2000. .
 Halliwell, Leslie. Leslie Halliwell's Film Guide. New York: Harper & Roe, 1989. .
 Sweet, Matthew. Shepperton Babylon: The Lost Worlds of British Cinema. London: Faber & Faber, 2005. .

External links
 
 

1940 films
1940s war drama films
British black-and-white films
British war drama films
Ealing Studios films
1940s English-language films
Films set in England
Royal Navy in World War II films
Seafaring films
1940 drama films
Films with screenplays by Patrick Kirwan
Films directed by Pen Tennyson
Films with screenplays by Pen Tennyson
British World War II films
1940s British films